The 2011 Arena Football League season was the 24th season in the history of the league. The regular season began on March 11, 2011 and ended on July 23, 2011. The Jacksonville Sharks, in their second year of existence, defeated the Arizona Rattlers 73–70 in ArenaBowl XXIV on August 12, 2011 to conclude the playoffs.

League business

Teams
Three franchises that competed in the 2008 season, the Philadelphia Soul, San Jose SaberCats, and Kansas City Command (formerly the Kansas City Brigade), returned to competition in the 2011 season, after an announcement made on June 19, 2010.

Two teams that competed in 2010 relocated and have assumed the history of former AFL franchises. It was announced on August 21, 2010 that the Alabama Vipers would become the Georgia Force, and on September 14, 2010 it was revealed that the Bossier–Shreveport Battle Wings would become the New Orleans VooDoo.

The Milwaukee Iron officially changed its name to the Milwaukee Mustangs on January 27, 2011, taking the name of the original franchise.

The city of Pittsburgh, Pennsylvania was awarded an expansion team on August 20, 2010. The team, named the Pittsburgh Power, was the first AFL team to call Pittsburgh home since the Pittsburgh Gladiators, one of the league's four original franchises. The Gladiators moved to Tampa, Florida and became the Tampa Bay Storm after the 1990 season.

The only team that did not return from the 2010 season was the Oklahoma City Yard Dawgz. Owner Phil Miller made the announcement on October 21, 2010, citing an inability to find minority investors as one reason for the decision to not compete.

Realignment
With several teams relocating, returning, or leaving, the AFL announced the divisional alignment for 2011 on October 21, 2010. Both conferences each had nine teams placed in two divisions.

Regular season schedule
Each team played an 18-game regular season with two bye weeks over the course of 20 weeks, making it the longest schedule in the history of the league. The first game of the season was played on March 11, 2011. The Pittsburgh Power began their inaugural season against the Philadelphia Soul, who played their first game since winning ArenaBowl XXII in 2008.

On July 9, the Spokane Shock and Utah Blaze played in a game billed as the "Joe Albi Stadium Summer Classic". The game was played outdoors at Joe Albi Stadium under normal arena football rules.

Regular season standings

Eight teams qualify for the playoffs: four teams from each conference, of which two are division champions and the other two have the best records of the teams remaining.
 Green indicates clinched playoff berth
 Blue indicates division champion
 Gray indicates division champion and conference's best record

Tie-breakers
 Georgia clinched the No. 3 seed in the American Conference based on their greater point differential in head-to-head competition with Orlando.
 Spokane clinched the No. 4 seed in the National Conference based on their greater point differential in head-to-head competition with Utah.

Statistics
Final statistics

Passing

Rushing

Receiving

Awards

All-Arena team

All-Ironman team
On August 8, 2011, the All-Ironman team was announced, with P. J. Berry of the New Orleans VooDoo being named the Ironman of the Year.

Playoffs

Conference semifinals

Conference finals

ArenaBowl XXIV

References